Margaret Mary Heckler (née O'Shaughnessy; June 21, 1931 – August 6, 2018) was an American politician and diplomat who represented  in the United States House of Representatives from 1967 until 1983. A member of the Republican Party, she also served as the 15th United States Secretary of Health and Human Services from 1983 to 1985, as well as United States ambassador to Ireland from 1986 to 1989.

Early life
She was born Margaret Mary O'Shaughnessy in Flushing, New York. 
Her undergraduate studies began at Albertus Magnus in New Haven, Connecticut. She then studied abroad at the University of Leiden, in the Netherlands, in 1952 and went on to graduate from Albertus Magnus College (B.A. 1953) and from Boston College Law School (LL.B. 1956). She was the only woman in her law school class. She was admitted to the bar in Massachusetts. She was an editor of the Annual Survey of Massachusetts Law.

From 1963 to 1967, Heckler was the first woman to serve on the Governor's council for the Commonwealth of Massachusetts, was a delegate to the Republican National Convention in 1964 and 1968, and was elected as a Republican from the 90th to the 97th Congresses (January 3, 1967 – January 3, 1983).

Heckler received an honorary doctorate from Johnson & Wales University in 1975.

Congressional career

In Congress, Heckler was generally regarded as a "Rockefeller Republican" who supported moderate to liberal policies favored by voters in her state. Heckler voted in favor of the Civil Rights Act of 1968. In 1977, she launched and founded the idea of the Congresswoman's Caucus, a bipartisan group of 14 members focused on equality for women in Social Security, tax laws, and related areas. Heckler was also an outspoken advocate for and cosponsor of the Equal Rights Amendment. She opposed abortion but then did not favor a constitutional amendment to ban it. Later in life, however, Heckler became a speaker and anti-abortion activist.

In Massachusetts, she was noted for building an especially-effective network of constituent services that allowed her to breeze through several re-election bids in an overwhelmingly-Democratic state. In the capital, Heckler was noted as a socialite with a penchant for high fashion.

In the House, she served on the Banking and Currency Committee as well as ranking member of the Veterans' Affairs Committee (1975–1983). She also served as ranking member of the House Beauty Shop Committee (1971–1979), replacing Representative Catherine May, who had been defeated for re-election.

Electoral history
Heckler won her first term in 1966 by defeating 42-year incumbent Republican Joseph W. Martin, Jr., in the primary. Martin, then 82, had previously served as Speaker of the House and was 46 years older than Heckler. Heckler won the subsequent general election with just 51 percent of the votes but was easily re-elected thereafter.

Following the 1980 census, Massachusetts lost one of its congressional seats because of its population growth. Heckler's district, then the only one in Massachusetts large enough to not need redistricting, was combined with that of freshman Democratic Representative Barney Frank. The district was numerically Frank's district, the 4th, but it was geographically more Heckler's district. When both ran against each other in 1982, Heckler began the race as a frontrunner. Although she opposed Reagan on 43 percent of House votes, Frank successfully portrayed Heckler as a Reagan ally by pointing to her early support for his tax cuts, which she later retracted. She lost the support of the National Organization for Women because she opposed federal funding for abortion. She went on to lose the race by a larger-than-expected margin of 20%. After her defeat, no woman would be elected to Congress from Massachusetts until Niki Tsongas won a special election in 2007.

Health and Human Services Secretary

After her defeat, Heckler turned down several government jobs, including as an assistant NASA administrator, before Reagan nominated her to replace retiring Health and Human Services Secretary Richard Schweiker in January 1983. She was confirmed on March 3, 1983 by an 82-3 vote in the Senate. All three dissenters were conservative Republicans.

Early on as secretary, Heckler commissioned the Secretarial Task Force to investigate a "sad and significant fact: there was a continuing disparity in the burden of death and illness experienced by Blacks and other minority Americans as compared with our nation's population as a whole," as she put it in her opening letter in The Secretary's Report on Black and Minority Health, also known as the Heckler Report. The report provided the historical foundation for many reports thereafter and is often referenced as a landmark document for health disparity and health equity inquiry. Clarice Reid was a member of the task force that helped to produce the report.

As secretary, Heckler publicly supported the Reagan administration's more conservative views, presided over staffing cuts in the department as part of the administration's spending reductions, and frequently spoke on a wide array of public health issues, including the emerging AIDS crisis. It was very difficult for Heckler to get the topic of AIDS on the Cabinet meeting agendas, and she reportedly never discussed the crisis with Reagan.

Heckler repeatedly assured the American public that the nation's blood supply was "100% safe... for both the hemophiliac who requires large transfusions and for the average citizen who might need it for surgery."

On January 21, 1985, Heckler became the first woman to be named designated survivor. She served in the role during the inauguration.

Public divorce saga
Heckler's tenure as secretary was also marked by scandal in the Washington press when her husband, John, filed for divorce in 1984. The episode was tinged by election-year concerns over the impact of the divorce on conservative voters and dragged on for months as the couple argued whether Massachusetts or Virginia, to where she had moved, had jurisdiction in the case.

Departure from Cabinet

Although Heckler stayed on in the Cabinet after Reagan's re-election and was widely regarded as an effective spokesperson, press accounts in late 1985 revealed that some White House and agency insiders regarded her as an ineffective manager. 

White House Chief of Staff Donald Regan reportedly pushed for Heckler's dismissal, but Reagan told reporters "there has never been any thought in my mind to fire" her. Instead, she was appointed as Ambassador to Ireland, with a $16,000 pay cut that prompted the press to ridicule Reagan's characterization of the situation as a "promotion." She was confirmed as ambassador in December 1985.

Ambassador to Ireland
As ambassador, Heckler played a crucial role in obtaining a US$120 million grant to the International Fund for Ireland, an economic development organization. She was a frequent guest on Irish television programs and was "by all accounts an effective spokesperson for her government's policies on everything from Central America to international trade." In February 1989, Heckler announced her intent to resign to pursue a private career, and her term concluded in August 1989.

On May 31, 1987, Heckler became the first woman to deliver the commencement address in the history of the University of Scranton. Heckler's papers are housed in the Burns Library at Boston College.

Death
Heckler died at Virginia Hospital Center in Arlington, Virginia, on August 6, 2018, at the age of 87.

See also
 List of female United States Cabinet members
 Women in the United States House of Representatives

References

Sources
 Jane Anderson. "Two Massachusetts Incumbents Fight for Single Seat in Congress." Miami Herald, October 17, 1982, pg. 5D.
 Karen DeYoung. "Margaret Heckler, All Emerald Smiles", Washington Post, March 18, 1987, pg. D1.
 David Hoffman. "Heckler Offered Irish Ambassadorship", Washington Post, October 1, 1985, pg. A1.
 Stephanie Mansfield. "The Heckler Breakup", Washington Post, October 16, 1984, pg. B1.
 Donnie Radcliffe. "The Women's Caucus", Washington Post, April 27, 1978, pg. B12.
 Spencer Rich. "Heckler's Administrative Skills Called Inadequate for Agency", Washington Post, October 1, 1985, pg. A1.
 Myron Stuck and Sarah Fitzgerald. "Senate Confirms Heckler." Washington Post. 03/04/1983. p. A13.

External links

 
"Speaker of the House: Joe Martin of N. Attleboro", projo.com, July 26, 1999; accessed February 12, 2017.
Clerk of the U.S. House of Representatives website; accessed February 12, 2017.
“Father and Son Rally the Troops on Maryland Truth Tour”, prolifeaction.org; accessed February 12, 2017.
Heckler election records at ourcampaigns.com

|-

|-

1931 births
2018 deaths
Albertus Magnus College alumni
Ambassadors of the United States to Ireland
American expatriates in the Netherlands
Female members of the United States House of Representatives
Boston College Law School alumni
Members of the Massachusetts Governor's Council
People from Queens, New York
Reagan administration cabinet members
Republican Party members of the United States House of Representatives from Massachusetts
United States Secretaries of Health and Human Services
Women in Massachusetts politics
Women members of the Cabinet of the United States
20th-century American politicians
20th-century American diplomats
American women ambassadors
20th-century American lawyers
20th-century American women politicians